Diablo Canyon is an album by the American Southern rock band Outlaws, released in 1994. Hughie Thomasson was the only original member of the band.

"Brother Travis" was written with Ronnie Van Zant.

Critical reception

The Miami New Times praised the "soaring harmonies and searing guitar solos that refuse to fall into cliche," writing that "Thomasson's vocals sound as potent and full of meaning as ever."

AllMusic wrote that the album "manages to be an impressively lean and rockin' album—cut directly from the unmistakable Southern rock cloth."

Track listing
"Diablo Canyon" (Thomasson) – 7:01
"Dregs Fall to the Wicked" (Cooper, Thomasson, Tsaerios) – 5:10
"Let the Fingers Do the Walkin'" (Thomasson) – 4:49
"Steam on the Blacktop" (Kortchmar, Lynch) – 4:49
"Macon Blues" (Hicks) – 5:48
"New Frontier" (Borden, Hicks, Thomasson, Howell) – 5:20
"Brother Travis" (Borden, Hicks, Thomasson, Howell) – 4:58
"The Wheel" (Hicks) – 5:20
"Freedom in Flight" (Thomasson) – 4:21
"Alligator Alley" (Thomasson) – 4:52

Personnel
Hughie Thomasson - lead guitars, lead vocals
Chris Hicks - lead guitars, lead vocals
Jeff Howell - bass, vocals
B.B. Borden - drums, percussion

Additional Musicians
Gary Rossington - guitar, slide guitar
Billy Powell - piano
Mickey Mulcahy - guitar
Mike Varney - guitar
Willie Morris - background vocals
Mike Mani - Hammond B-3 organ

Production
Producers: Steve Fontano, Hughie Thomasson, Mickey Mulcahy
Executive Producer: Mike Varney
Engineers: Steve Fontano, Gregg Schnitzer, Wally Walton
Assistant engineer: Terry Weeks
Mixing: Steve Fontano, Hughie Thomasson
Mastering: George Horn

References

Outlaws (band) albums
1994 albums